Red frog may refer to:

Frogs
 Red rain frog (Scaphiophryne gottlebei), a Madagascan frog in the family Microhylidae
 Red stream frog (Limnonectes doriae), a frog in the family Dicroglossidae found in Southeast Asia
 Red tree frog (Leptopelis rufus), a frog in the family Hyperoliidae found in many African countries
 Red-eared frog (Hylarana erythraea), a frog in the family Ranidae found in Southeast Asia
 Little red frog (disambiguation)
 Red-eyed frog (disambiguation)
 Red-legged frog (disambiguation)

Other uses
 Red Frog Events, a privately owned event production company based in Chicago
 Red Frogs, an Australian volunteer-based support network for university students and school-leavers

Animal common name disambiguation pages